Florida swamps include a variety of wetland habitats. Because of its high water table, substantial rainfall, and often flat geography, the U.S. state of Florida has a proliferation of swamp areas, some of them unique to the state.

Swamp types in Florida include:
Cypress dome - most common swamp habitat in Florida
Strand swamp
Floodplain swamp
Titi swamp
Tupelo gum swamp
Mangrove swamp

Notable swamps
 Green Swamp (Florida) (including the Green Swamp Wilderness Preserve), Polk County
 Everglades
 Corkscrew Swamp Sanctuary in southwest Florida north of Naples, Florida
 Okefenokee Swamp, straddling the Georgia–Florida border
 Barley Barber Swamp
 Santa Fe Swamp

Animal species
Rare animals inhabiting swamps include:
 the Florida panther, an endangered subspecies of cougar (Puma concolor).
 the American alligator

Plant species
Some of the species found in the various types of swamps include:
 Cypress
 bald cypress (Taxodium distichum)
 pond cypress (Taxodium ascendens)
 red mangrove (Rhizophora mangle)
 Palms
 cabbage palm (Sabal palmetto)
 Florida royal palm (Roystonea regia)
 sawgrass (Cladium jamaicense)
 Spanish moss (Tillandsia usneoides)

References

External links

 01
Wetlands of Florida
Natural history of Florida